Uredo behnickiana is a fungal plant pathogen. It is known as a pathogen of Cattleya orchids.

References

External links 
 Index Fungorum
 USDA ARS Fungal Database

Fungal plant pathogens and diseases
Orchid diseases
Teliomycotina